Stern is a given name. Notable people with the name include:

Stern Hu (born 1963), Australian businessman 
Stern John (born 1976), Trinidadian football manager and former player
Stern Noel Liffa (born 2000), Malawian athlete

See also
Stern (surname)
Stearne, given name and surname